Carl Eugene Lilly Jr. (born March 11, 1983), better known by his stage name Gudda Gudda, is an American rapper from New Orleans. He was originally a member of Sqad Up with Kidd Kidd and Lil Wayne. After forging a long-time friendship with Wayne, he signed to Young Money Entertainment, and later Republic Records.

Biography

1983–2003: Early life and career 
Gudda was born Carl Lilly on March 11, 1983, in San Jose, California. When he was still a baby he moved to New Orleans, Louisiana. He grew up in the 9th Ward, where he befriended Lil Wayne at the age of fifteen, who he met at a dice game. This was much before he had ever thought of rapping as a career. As he began to rap, Wayne would mentor and inspire him, and actually wrote Gudda's first rap. Together they formed the group Sqad Up with rappers Dizzy and Kidd Kidd. Throughout 2002 and 2003, Gudda was featured on the seven mixtapes that Sqad Up released over the time period.

2005–12: Guddaville series and collaborations 
Gudda Gudda would be one of the first artists signed to Wayne's Young Money Entertainment upon its officially founding in 2005. Gudda had been present the day Wayne had come up with the idea for Young Money. A short time later, Gudda signed a deal with Cash Money Records and Republic Records. On May 26, 2009, Gudda released Certified a collaboration album with fellow rapper Lil Flip on Real Talk Entertainment. The album was met with generally positive reviews. On September 28, 2009, Gudda released his first official solo mixtape Guddaville, which featured guest appearances from Lil Wayne, Drake, Tyga, Lil Twist, Nicki Minaj, Jae Millz, Shanell, Mack Maine, Lil Flip, Tity Boi, Bow Wow, and Ya Boy among others. He described the mixtapes theme to MTV saying, "I'm taking people on a walk through my eyes. Every time you heard me been a group project. Guddaville is just me expressing how I feel about a lot of different things, taking you in my world."

Gudda was featured on Birdman's album Pricele$$ on the track "Hustle" and prominently featured on the Young Money group album We Are Young Money being featured on eight tracks, including the singles "Every Girl" and "BedRock." Both singles were hits, each peaking in the top ten of the Billboard Hot 100. He was also featured on the track "I Don't Like the Look of It" on Lil Wayne's album I Am Not a Human Being. On June 7, 2010, Gudda released the sequel to his first mixtape titled, Back 2 Guddaville. His second official mixtape featured guest appearances from Waka Flocka Flame, Mack Maine, Jay Rock, Lil Wayne, Vado, Ya Boy and Jae Millz, among others.

Then for two years Gudda remained quiet recording music without releasing hardly any music. He was featured on the remix to "I'm On" along with Big K.R.I.T., Jadakiss, J. Cole, Kendrick Lamar, B.o.B, Tyga, and Bun B. On November 5, 2012, Gudda released the tracklist to his third official mixtape Guddaville 3. The tracklist revealed guest appearances from Wiz Khalifa, 2 Chainz, Lil Wayne, Mystikal, Crooked I, Trae tha Truth, Ace Hood, Future, Jae Millz, Birdman, Kevin Gates, Tyga, and Mack Maine. Two days later on November 7, 2012, Gudda released Guddaville 3. Around the time he formed the group Loyalty Amongst Thieves, featuring Kevin Gates, Flow and T-Streets, which he said planned to release a self-titled mixtape.

2013–present: Redrum and Guddaville: The Album 
On March 11, 2013, Gudda released his fourth official mixtape Redrum. The mixtape featured guest appearances from Busta Rhymes, Jae Millz, Cory Gunz, Boo, and Charlie Rock among others. Production was handled by Cardiak, Young Chop, I.N.F.O., and Jahlil Beats among others. The mixtape was mainly a compilation of songs that did not make the final tracklist of Guddaville 3. Following its release, Gudda announced in an interview that he was working on his debut studio album Guddaville: The Album, later confirmed for release in 2014. He also said that he would release another mixtape Guddaville 4 prior to the album's release. Additionally he revealed he was starting his own production company Gudda Music and the Loyalty Amongst Thieves mixtape had already been completed.

Billboard praised his verse on Lil Wayne's I Am Not a Human Being II track "Gunwalk" as "show stealing". Gudda and Mack Maine would be the only rappers to be featured on The H a mixtape by Rick Ross and Birdman. He was also featured on two tracks on the 2013 YMCMB compilation album Rich Gang, including "Panties To The Side" with Bow Wow, French Montana and Tyga. He confirmed guest appearances on Guddaville: The Album to come from Lil Wayne, Busta Rhymes, and Drake, while also saying his dream collaborations would be with Kool G Rap or Dr. Dre. On March 11, 2014, Young Money released their second compilation album Young Money: Rise of an Empire, where Gudda was featured on two songs, "Fresher Than Ever" and "You Already Know". L.A.T (Loyalty Amongst Thieves) will be released in July 2014.

Personal life 
As of early 2013, Gudda Gudda was living in Houston, Texas and Cash Money Records headquarters Miami, Florida. He indicated most of his time was spent in the studio, with the rest of his time going towards being with his children.

Discography

Collaboration albums

Compilation albums

Mixtapes

Singles

As lead artist

Promotional singles

Other charted songs

Guest appearances

Awards and nominations

BET Awards 
The BET Awards were established in 2001 by the Black Entertainment Television (BET) network to celebrate African Americans and other minorities in music, acting, sports and other fields of entertainment. The awards are presented annually and broadcasts live on BET.

|-
|rowspan="3"|2010
|rowspan="2"|Young Money
|Best New Artist
|
|-
|Best Group
|
|-
|"BedRock" (Young Money featuring Lloyd)
|Viewer's Choice
|
|-
|rowspan="1"|2014
|Young Money
|Best Group
|
|}

References

External links 
 
 Gudda Gudda on Twitter

African-American male rappers
Living people
Cash Money Records artists
Young Money Entertainment artists
1983 births
Rappers from New Orleans
People from San Jose, California
Republic Records artists
Southern hip hop musicians
21st-century American rappers
21st-century American male musicians
21st-century African-American musicians
20th-century African-American people